Sasha Amira Abunnadi (born January 1,1984, in Abbotsford, British Columbia) was the first Miss BC World, and was elected for the reign of 2005/2006. She represented British Columbia at Miss World Canada on July 16, 2006, in Toronto, Ontario, where she placed in the Top 15 Semi-Finals, and won the award for "Best In Interview". Sasha also placed in the top 10 as a "Beauty with a Purpose Honourable Mention".

She is currently enrolled at her local university and is studying biology. Her hobbies include travelling, reading, swimming, and hiking, and she is inspired by Nazanin Afshin-Jam. She is fluent in French and English, and studies Arabic and Spanish. Sasha is also an aspiring model, and has participated in a number of fashion shows and print magazines across the province.

2005/2006 Results

Miss World Canada: Top 15 Semi-Finalist 
Best in Interview Award
Beauty With A Purpose Honourable Mention

Miss B.C. World: Sasha Abunnadi - Abbotsford
1st Runner-up: Colleen Williams - Surrey
2nd Runner-up: Sahar Biniaz - Richmond
3rd Runner-up: Tamara Blondin - Langley

References

External links
Sasha Abunnadi
Miss BC World Official Site

1984 births
Living people
Canadian beauty pageant winners
Canadian beauty pageant contestants
Canadian people of Palestinian descent
People from Abbotsford, British Columbia